The Association of Physicians for Humanism is a not for profit organisation of medical doctors in South Korea founded on 21 November 1987.  Chung Hyung-jun is the executive director.

It was established in the aftermath of democratisation and campaigns for people's health and human rights in the Republic of Korea.

References

External links

1987 establishments in South Korea
Medical and health organizations based in South Korea
Organizations established in 1987